Panamerican Tennis Center (Centro Panamericano de Tenis), formerly The Telcel Tennis Complex, is a tennis center in Zapopan, Mexico. It was officially opened on 15 October 2010, in a ceremony and exhibition tournament featuring tennis professionals Andre Agassi and Jim Courier. The complex consists of a main court with a capacity of 2,592, 8 tournament courts, 4 practice courts and an underground parking lot. It hosted the tennis competition at the 2011 Pan American Games. For the games it had a temporary capacity of 6,639 for the entire complex. 

It was sponsored by the Mexican communications company Telcel.

The Panamerican Tennis Center hosted the Abierto Zapopan from 2019 to 2022, a tennis tournament part of the WTA 250 and since, 2022, is the home of the WTA 1000 GDL Open Akron, the first of its kind in Latin America. The centre also became the first Latin American venue to host the WTA Finals when the city was awarded the hosting rights in 2021 just two months prior to organizing the actual event. It also used to host the ATP challenger tournament, Jalisco Open until 2018.

See also
 Tennis at the 2011 Pan American Games

References

External links
 Profile

2010 establishments in Mexico
Sports venues in Guadalajara, Jalisco
Venues of the 2011 Pan American Games